Two Ponds National Wildlife Refuge is the smallest urban unit of the National Wildlife Refuge System. The refuge is located in the City of Arvada, Jefferson County, Colorado, United States. The site sits in the midst of a region of suburban expansion of the Denver Metropolitan Area, and was saved from development in 1990 by a group of concerned people, now a Friend's group entitled the Two Ponds Preservation Foundation. The refuge was established in 1992 and continues to protect various animals as well as unique high prairie plants, and offers visitors many activities, including hiking, guided tours, and group educational opportunities.

References

Arvada, Colorado
National Wildlife Refuges in Colorado
Protected areas of Jefferson County, Colorado
Protected areas established in 1992
Wetlands of Colorado
Landforms of Jefferson County, Colorado